In 1956, the United States FBI, under Director J. Edgar Hoover, continued for a seventh year to maintain a public list of the people it regarded as the Ten Most Wanted Fugitives.

At only five new additions that year, 1956 became the shortest list of new Top Tenners added by the FBI in a single year up to that time.  1956 is also notable as the first year in which a Top Tenner made a second appearance on the list.  That fugitive, Nick George Montos, the first new addition in 1956 as Fugitive #94, had also appeared four years earlier as Fugitive #37 on the 1952 list.  Such second appearances on the FBI list were to become, curiously, not highly unusual in the early decades of the Ten Most Wanted Fugitives.  However, although some fugitives were adept at repeated prison escapes, and some were repeat offenders upon release, none has yet managed to become a third timer to be listed on the FBI Ten list.

1956 fugitives
The "Ten Most Wanted Fugitives" listed by the FBI in 1956 include (in FBI list appearance sequence order):

Nick George Montos
March 2, 1956 #94
One month on the list
Nick George Montos - U.S. prisoner arrested March 28, 1956, in his motel room in Memphis, Tennessee, after being recognized by a citizen;  until his earlier capture in 1954 at Chicago, Illinois, he had also been listed as Fugitive #37 in 1952, at large for two years

James Ignatius Faherty
March 19, 1956 #95
Two months on the list
James Ignatius Faherty - U.S. prisoner arrested May 16, 1956, in Boston, Massachusetts, together with Thomas Francis Richardson (Fugitive #96)

Thomas Francis Richardson
April 12, 1956 #96
One month on the list
Thomas Francis Richardson - U.S. prisoner arrested May 16, 1956, in Boston, Massachusetts, together with James Ignatius Faherty (Fugitive #95)

Eugene Francis Newman
May 28, 1956 #97
Nine years on the list
Eugene Francis Newman - PROCESS DISMISSED June 11, 1965, in Buffalo, New York

Carmine DiBiase
May 28, 1956 #98
Two years on the list
Carmine DiBiase - U.S. prisoner surrendered August 28, 1958, to the FBI through a New York City attorney. Following his surrender, DiBiase reportedly made the following statement: "I am getting older and accomplishing nothing having to stay away from my wife and children, mother and father. I am glad it is over. I had to come in."

Later entries
FBI Ten Most Wanted Fugitives, 2020s
FBI Ten Most Wanted Fugitives, 2010s
FBI Ten Most Wanted Fugitives, 2000s
FBI Ten Most Wanted Fugitives, 1990s
FBI Ten Most Wanted Fugitives, 1980s
FBI Ten Most Wanted Fugitives, 1970s
FBI Ten Most Wanted Fugitives, 1960s
FBI Ten Most Wanted Fugitives, 1950s

External links
Current FBI top ten most wanted fugitives at FBI site
FBI pdf source document listing all Ten Most Wanted year by year (removed by FBI)

 
1956 in the United States